Hugh Osborne Douglas   was an eminent Church of Scotland minister in the 20th century.

He was born into an ecclesiastical family   in Glasgow on 11 September 1911 and educated at Glasgow Academy and the University of Glasgow. Licensed to preach by the Presbytery of Glasgow in 1935 he was Assistant Minister at Govan Old Parish Church until 1939. He was also Minister at St John's Leven, North Leith Parish Church and Dundee Parish Church (St Mary's) during his long career. He was Moderator of the General Assembly of the Church of Scotland from 1970 to 1971 and  Dean of the Chapel Royal from 1974 until 1981.

An Honorary Chaplain to the Queen from 1959, he died on  4 January 1986.

Notes

1911 births
People educated at the Glasgow Academy
Alumni of the University of Glasgow
20th-century Ministers of the Church of Scotland
Honorary Chaplains to the Queen
Moderators of the General Assembly of the Church of Scotland
Deans of the Chapel Royal in Scotland
Commanders of the Order of the British Empire
Knights Commander of the Royal Victorian Order
1986 deaths
People associated with Dundee